Agononida garciai is a species of squat lobster in the family Munididae. The species name is in reference to Antoni García Rubies.

References

Squat lobsters
Crustaceans described in 2004